St John's Church is a former church building in Ballachulish, Highland, Scotland. It dates to 1842, replacing an earlier Episcopal church, and was designed by Oban architect Peter Macnab. It is now Category C listed, and stands a few yards southeast of the present church building. The church's burial ground, which features a ha-ha at the seaward boundary, is Category B listed. According to Historic Environment Scotland, it contains an "exceptional collection of 19th-century finely inscribed" tomb stones.

The church's nave was added in 1842, followed forty years later by its chancel.

The main entrance is in the centre of the western gable; a secondary entrance is located in the eastern end of the northern wall.

Burial ground

See also
List of listed buildings in Lismore and Appin

References

Churches completed in 1842
Churches in Highland (council area)
Listed churches in Scotland
Former churches in Scotland
Category C listed buildings in Highland (council area)